Albanian Orthodox Archdiocese may refer to:

 Albanian Orthodox Archdiocese of Tirana-Durrës, the principal diocese of Albanian Orthodox Church
 Albanian Orthodox Archdiocese in America, a diocese of the Orthodox Church in America

See also
 Albanian Orthodox Diocese of America